Neubrunn is a municipality in Southwest Thuringia in Landkreis Schmalkalden-Meiningen,  from Meiningen.

References

Schmalkalden-Meiningen
Duchy of Saxe-Meiningen